Georgios Alexander Nilsson Likourentzos (born 23 October 1992) is a Swedish professional footballer who plays for Qormi as a forward.

Club career

Malmö FF
Nilsson made his debut for Malmö FF in 2008 only 15 years of age. On 24 May 2010 he made his debut in the starting 11 and scored two goals in the game. He has only been given limited match time since being promoted to the first team, however he is still one of the youngest players in the first team squad.

On 14 May 2012 he scored a late equaliser against IFK Göteborg to draw the game at 2-2. On 24 May he scored his 4th goal in Allsvenskan against GIF Sundsvall, a game in which he both came on as a substitute early and was later substituted himself.
On 19 July, Nillson scored the winning goal in friendly match over Premier League side West Bromwich Albion. The 2012 season was an overall breakthrough for Nilsson as he played 17 matches in the league and scored two league goals.

Landskrona BoIS
It was announced on 19 December 2012 that Nilsson would be on loan to Superettan side Landskrona BoIS for the duration of the 2013 season. Nilsson played 22 league matches and scored eight goals during his loan spell at Landskrona.

Trelleborgs FF
On 14 February 2014  Malmö FF announced that Nilsson would go on loan to Division 1 side Trelleborgs FF for the duration of the 2014 season. Nilsson made 22 league appearances for the club during the loan spell, scoring 11 goals.

Qrendi
Ahead of the 2019-20 season, Nilsson joined Maltese club Qrendi.

Career statistics
As of 1 November 2014.

References

External links

 Malmö FF profile 
 
 

1992 births
Swedish footballers
Swedish expatriate footballers
Swedish people of Greek descent
Sweden youth international footballers
Living people
Malmö FF players
Landskrona BoIS players
Trelleborgs FF players
Qormi F.C. players
Tarxien Rainbows F.C. players
Birkirkara F.C. players
BK Olympic players
Ħamrun Spartans F.C. players
Allsvenskan players
Superettan players
Maltese Premier League players
Footballers from Skåne County
Association football forwards
Expatriate footballers in Malta
Swedish expatriate sportspeople in Malta